The 2009 Carfax 400 is a NASCAR Sprint Cup Series race that took place on August 16, 2009, at Michigan International Speedway in Brooklyn, Michigan. Actual start time of the race was 2:10PM Eastern Daylight Time; meaning that the race ended at exactly 5:12 PM EDT.

Background

Opened in 1968, the track's turns are banked at eighteen degrees, while the 3,600-foot-long front stretch, the location of the finish line, is banked at twelve degrees. The back stretch, has a five degree banking and is 2,242 feet long.

Summary
200 laps were run on a paved oval track spanning . Out of the 43 race car drivers on the grid, there were 41 American-born driers and two foreigners (Marcos Ambrose from Australia and Juan Pablo Montoya from Colombia). There were seven cautions for 36 laps and the race lasted three hours and two minutes. Attendance was 103,000 strong and Brian Vickers (driving a Toyota Camry) won the race under a fuel mileage finish. The other contenders who finished in the top ten were: Jeff Gordon (lost by 1.409 seconds), Dale Earnhardt Jr., Carl Edwards, Sam Hornish Jr., Casey Mears, Joey Logano, Clint Bowyer, David Reutimann, and Denny Hamlin. Jimmie Johnson had a dominant run during the closing laps until he ran out of fuel. He later admitted that his team was not good on fuel mileage during the race.

Tony Raines failed to qualify for the race due to lack of speed. There were two instances of rain during the race which eventually returned to fair weather.

Results

References

Carfax 400
Carfax 400
NASCAR races at Michigan International Speedway
August 2009 sports events in the United States